NGC 378 is a barred spiral galaxy located in the constellation Sculptor. It was discovered on September 28, 1834 by John Herschel.

References

0378
Barred spiral galaxies
Astronomical objects discovered in 1834
Sculptor (constellation)
003907